Véronique Schurmann (born 13 June 1967) is a former Belgian racing cyclist. She finished in third place in the Belgian National Road Race Championships in 1992.

References

External links

1967 births
Living people
Belgian female cyclists
People from Dendermonde
Cyclists from East Flanders